Baby Talk is an American sitcom that aired on ABC from March 8, 1991, until May 8, 1992, as part of ABC's TGIF lineup. The show was loosely based on the Look Who's Talking movies and was adapted for television by Ed. Weinberger. Amy Heckerling created characters for the series while using key creative and script elements from Look Who's Talking, which she had written and directed. Weinberger served as executive producer during the first season, and was replaced by Saul Turteltaub and Bernie Orenstein in the second season.

Synopsis and changing formats
Baby Talk featured the adventures of Baby Mickey (played by Ryan & Paul Jessup, voiced by Tony Danza), as he commented to the audience on the misgivings and new wonders of his world. Danza made an appearance in one episode as Mickey's father. Mickey's mother, Maggie Campbell, was played by two different actresses -- Julia Duffy during the spring 1991 run, and Mary Page Keller for the show's only full season—at different points during the series' short existence.

Connie Sellecca was the first actor cast in the role of Maggie but, dissatisfied with the role, she quit after a few episodes had been taped. This caused Baby Talk to be delayed from its intended September 1990 premiere to March 1991 (by then, enough episodes had been reshot with Duffy). Rare footage of the mostly unseen Sellecca version was featured in the 1990 ABC Fall Preview Show. In fact, the series first went into development titled Look Who's Talking, but by the summer of 1990, with the movie sequel Look Who's Talking Too hitting theaters in December of that year, Ed. Weinberger and Amy Heckerling thought it would be best to avoid causing confusion among viewers. With the TV series and movie likely to run concurrently, they decided to rename the series Baby Talk before fall promotions began.

Season 1
In the first season, Maggie Campbell (Julia Duffy) was adjusting to life as a single mother from the start. It was explained that Mickey's father, who got Maggie pregnant while she was unmarried, had never separated from his supposed ex-wife. Maggie left the father but she decided to keep her baby as the one positive centerpiece from the failed relationship. Little Mickey quickly expressed out loud to viewers his realization that there was no daddy around when Maggie responded to the amorous advances of many of the single men who passed through - namely that of Joe (George Clooney), one of the construction workers renovating the Campbell's not-yet-finished New York City loft. Mr. Fogarty (William Hickey) was the crew's foreman, and Howard (Lenny Wolpe), another construction worker who was always underfoot. Dr. Elliot Fleisher (Tom Alan Robbins) was Mickey's pediatrician, who also had eyes for Maggie. The doctors' office was another frequent setting in the first season, where Mickey interacted with other infants who had active, adult-like thoughts of their own. Andrea (Michelle Ashlee) was one of Dr. Fleisher's attending nurses. Charlotte Rae guest starred in one episode as Maggie's aunt.

Season 2
When Baby Talk returned in September 1991 for a full season order, drastic changes took place. In addition to Mary Page Keller now being in the role of Maggie, mother and son had moved, now residing in a trendy, uptown apartment in Manhattan. All other cast members, including George Clooney, were dropped from the show except for the Jessup twins. Polly Bergen joined the cast as Maggie's meddling mother Doris Campbell, who took great joy in co-raising Mickey while snooping around in her daughter's affairs. Scott Baio also signed on, sharing star billing with Keller, as James Halbrook, the building superintendent who became Maggie's new potential love interest. Living next door to the Campbells was sarcastic single mom Anita Craig (Francesca P. Roberts), whose infant daughter Danielle (played by Alicia and Celicia Johnson, voiced by Vernee Watson-Johnson) also had her thoughts featured regularly in play with Mickey's. Tony Craig (Wayne Collins) was Anita's young son, while Susan Davis (Jessica Lundy) was Maggie's best friend and co-worker at an accounting firm.

Tom Alan Robbins did appear as Dr. Fleisher in the opening scene of the second-season premiere. To ease confusion for returning viewers, writers wanted to carry over one adult cast member from the first season to help introduce Keller as Maggie. After this episode, Dr. Fleisher no longer appeared.

Cast and characters

Season 1
 Julia Duffy as Maggie Campbell
 Ryan & Paul Jessup as Mickey Campbell
 Tony Danza as Mickey Campbell (voice)
 George Clooney as Joe
 William Hickey as Mr. Fogarty
 Lenny Wolpe as Howard
 Tom Alan Robbins as Dr. Elliot Fleisher
 Michelle Ashlee as Nurse Andrea

Season 2
 Mary Page Keller as Maggie Campbell
 Ryan & Paul Jessup as Mickey Campbell
 Tony Danza as Mickey Campbell (voice)
 Scott Baio as James Halbrook
 Polly Bergen as Doris Campbell
 Francesca P. Roberts as Anita Craig
 Alicia & Celicia Johnson as Danielle Craig
 Vernee Watson-Johnson as Danielle Craig (Voice)
 Jessica Lundy as Susan Davis
 Wayne Collins as Tony Craig

Episodes

Series overview

Season 1 (1991)

Season 2 (1991–92)

Reception and cancellation
Baby Talk spent most of its life on ABC's TGIF in various timeslots. From April to May 1991, the show aired on Tuesdays at 8:30/7:30c in an effort to help the show's performance.

The show was initially a ratings success finishing the season ranked 27th among all programs with a 14.3 average household share, mostly due to the curiosity that had long surrounded the project, stemming from its movie influence and the behind-the scenes issues. However, from its premiere, critics derided the show heavily. They criticized the simple writing, overplayed character traits and the fact that the show centered on "a talking baby that happened to have a single mother", instead of Look Who's Talking, which was a success due to its centering on a "single mother who just happened to have a talking baby".

The ratings for Baby Talk granted its renewal for the fall 1991 schedule, but in light of the scathing reviews, personnel and storyline changes were inevitable. Julia Duffy wanted to leave the starring role, as she struggled to deal with the negative critical reception. When ABC renewed the show, Duffy was released from her contract, and was soon hired to replace Delta Burke on Designing Women. Duffy was the second actress in less than a year to relinquish the role of Maggie Campbell. Ed Weinberger was let go from the show by Columbia Television, who installed veterans Saul Turteltaub and Bernie Orenstein as the new showrunners.

Prior to the second season beginning, the new stars of Baby Talk were interviewed about their decisions to join a show that was so loathed by reviewers. Mary Page Keller claimed to have an indifference over the reputation of the show among critics, since she had never seen the show prior to replacing Julia Duffy. Scott Baio, who had watched the first season, agreed with some of the critics' views, but justified his joining the show by comparing it to Happy Days, of which he starred on as a teenager. In Baio's words: "I did a show for 11 years (Happy Days) that never ever got a good review. So we hope you guys will love it, but we're just going to do the best we can, and it's what the people like that's going to stay on".

When the series returned, ratings began to decline considerably during the second season. Numerous time slot adjustments, and the massive cast and setting overhaul for season two could not overcome the marginal ratings and the critical panning Baby Talk received. In fact, results of the 1991 Electronic Media Critics' Poll voted Baby Talk the Worst Series on Television. The series was cancelled in the spring of 1992.

Theme song
The series' theme song was a modernized, slightly re-written version of "Bread and Butter", a 1964 hit by The Newbeats. A few lines in both the chorus and stanzas were tinkered with to help illustrate the show's premise (the most obvious example being "..that's what mommy feeds him, 'cause he's her little man"). The first season had the main vocals done in a fashion similar to the original Newbeats recording, a raspy male falsetto. The second season had these vocals switched to those done by a high female voice, but the mid-range male sing of the chorus remained.

References

External links
 
 

1991 American television series debuts
1992 American television series endings
1990s American sitcoms
American Broadcasting Company original programming
English-language television shows
Live action television shows based on films
Television series about single parent families
Television series by Sony Pictures Television
Television shows set in Manhattan
TGIF (TV programming block)